This is a list of mayors of Floral Park, New York.

John McNeill (1937)
Frederick H. Heidtmann (1942–44)
Raymond I. Bundrick (1948–49)
Walter D. Lawrence (1953–54)
George Farrell
Joseph Driscoll
Henry W. Dwyer(1974–76)
Steven Corbett (1995-2001)
Ann Corbett (2001–2004)
Phil Guarnieri (2004–2009)
Kevin Greene (2009–2011)
Thomas Tweedy (2011–2017)
Dominick Longobardi (2017-2021)
Kevin M. Fitzgerald (2021-present)

References

http://politicalgraveyard.com/geo/NY/ofc/floralpark.html

Floral Park, New York
Floral Park, New York